Jovan Nenad (or ; ca. 1492 – 26 July 1527), known as the Black was a Serb military commander in the service of the Kingdom of Hungary who took advantage of a Hungarian military defeat at Mohács and subsequent struggle over the Hungarian throne to carve out his own state in the southern Pannonian Plain. He styled himself emperor (tsar).

Jovan Nenad is attributed by Serbian historians as the founder of Vojvodina and the leader of the last independent Serbian state before the Ottoman conquest.

Origin
An ethnic Serb, he was born ca. 1492 in Lipova near the Mureş River in northern Banat (present-day Romania). Other facts about his origins are uncertain; he himself claimed to be "a descendant of Serbian and Byzantine rulers", although other contemporaries thought that he was a descendant of the Serbian despots or that he was a man of low rank. He was of medium height, slender, and highly moral and pious. His contemporaries called him "the Black Man" because of a strange birthmark which many considered a divine mark: "he had a dark stripe, one finger wide, starting at the right temple of his head and running in a straight line over his body down to his right foot".

Military career

In the Battle of Mohács on 29 August 1526, the Ottoman Empire destroyed the army of Hungarian-Czech King Louis Jagellion, who was killed on the battlefield. After this battle, the Kingdom of Hungary became divided in three parts: Royal Hungary in the north and west became a Habsburg province, Transylvania in the east became an independent state, while the former central and southern parts of the Kingdom of Hungary were absorbed by the Ottoman Empire. As King Louis had no children, Hungary was divided into two parties: one elected John Zápolya, a respected Hungarian noble, while the other declared for the King of Hungary a Habsburg, Ferdinand, Louis' brother-in-law. A part of this struggle was the leader of Serb mercenaries, Jovan Nenad.

Right after Mohács, Jovan Nenad appeared between Tisza and Danube as a leader of a Serb regiment. He quickly drove the Ottomans from Bačka and parts of Banat and Syrmia, which he then ruled independently. At first he sided with the Zapolyai, however, after the Hungarian nobility of Bačka estranged him from John Zápolya (who also refused to acknowledge Nenad's territory), he decided to support the Habsburg pretender, Ferdinand, in the beginning of 1527. The conflict with the Hungarian nobility arose when Hungarian refugees were refused to return to their rightful properties in Bačka, which Nenad saw as his. With his forces he continued to pillage Hungarian estates and villages and terrorized the Hungarian population. This turned against him not just the Hungarian nobility but villagers and peasants as well.

He named Radoslav Čelnik the general commander of his army, while his emissaries to foreign rulers were Fabijan Literat, a Franciscan from Ilok, Ivan Dolić, the castellan of Bač from Irig. His treasurer and palatine was Subota Vrlić from Jagodina. Besides his main army, he also organized a personal guard numbering 600 soldiers. His army grew by drawing Serbs from Ottoman territory, Vlachs from Banat and Transylvania, and also some Roman Catholics, and by the beginning of 1527, it numbered around 15,000 men. It is believed that the cooperation of Orthodox and Catholic Slavs was the key of his later success. By the time of the reign of Jovan Nenad, Serbs had already considerable populations in the southern Pannonian Plain, most notably in the Danube and Tisa regions (a region commonly known as "Rascia").
 
Jovan Nenad considered the struggle around the Hungarian throne just a temporary occupation, his primary task being the fight against the Ottomans for the liberation of the Serb lands. In the first half of 1527, Ferdinand was outside of Hungary, preparing for what would become the Hungarian campaign of 1527–28 to fight Zápolya. During that time, King Zápolya sent armies after Jovan Nenad, wishing to settle his internal affairs before Ferdinand could return to Hungary. Underestimating Nenad's strength, Zápolya sent 300 knights under László Csáky, which were defeated by Jovan Nenad in early April, Csáky himself was captured and executed. After this, Jovan Nenad rose to the peak of his power and he styled himself Emperor. Another Hungarian army was dispatched, led by the Voivode of Transylvania, Péter Perényi. It was defeated by late April near Tiszaszőlős (Battle of Szőlős) on the banks of the Tisza river. Finally, a second army, which encompassed the entire strength of Transylvania and upper Hungary, led by Perényi and Bishop Czibak decisively defeated Jovan's army in the Battle of Sződfalva, killing around 8,000 of his men.

In an attempt to unite with the forces of Ferdinand, Jovan Nenad was severely wounded in Szeged. In his retreat towards Senta, he was intercepted and murdered in the village of Tornjoš. Jovan Nenad's head was delivered to Zápolya and soon after his death the remainder of his army dispersed, which was the end of Jovan Nenad's liberation movement. After Jovan Nenad's death his general Radoslav Čelnik led the remains of the army to Ottoman Syrmia, where he ruled until 1530 as an Ottoman vassal, and then as a Habsburg subject.

Legacy
 
As time passed, Jovan Nenad became a mythical figure to the Serbs. Many Serbian historians consider him the founder of contemporary Vojvodina, although in reality his insurrection was too short-lived and his reign too tumultuous to have a lasting impact.  Subotica, the province's second largest city (which was once his capital) erected a monument to him bearing the inscription "Your thought has prevailed".

In popular culture
In the 1942 Hollywood film, Cat People, a small statue of Jovan Nenad (albeit referenced as "King John of Serbia"), plays a central role in developing the underlying mythological basis of the film's plot.  The statue is of Jovan Nenad on horseback holding up an impaled cat on his sword.

See also
 Starina Novak (1530s-1601), hajduk leader
 List of Serbian rulers
 List of rulers of Vojvodina
 Serbs of Vojvodina
 Rascians

Annotations

References

Sources

External links
  Još jednom o caru Jovanu Nenadu

16th-century Serbian nobility
16th-century Serbian monarchs
Eastern Orthodox monarchs
Serbian military leaders
Serbian rebels
Serbs of Romania
People from Subotica
History of Bačka
History of Banat
16th century in Serbia
1527 deaths
Year of birth uncertain
1492 births
People from Lipova, Arad
Self-proclaimed monarchy